Andrés Molteni and Horacio Zeballos were the defending champions, but chose not to participate together. Molteni played alongside Roman Jebavý, but lost in the quarterfinals to Marco Cecchinato and Dušan Lajović. 

Zeballos successfully defended the title alongside Máximo González, defeating Diego Schwartzman and Dominic Thiem in the final, 6–1, 6–1.

Seeds

Draw

Draw

References

External links
 Main draw

Argentina Open - Doubles
ATP Buenos Aires